Myrmecophily is the term applied to positive interspecies associations between ants and a variety of other organisms, such as plants, other arthropods, and fungi. Myrmecophily refers to mutualistic associations with ants, though in its more general use, the term may also refer to commensal or even parasitic interactions.

The term "myrmecophile" is used mainly for animals that associate with ants. An estimated 10,000 species of ants (Formicidae) are known, with a higher diversity in the tropics. In most terrestrial ecosystems, ants are ecologically and numerically dominant, being the main invertebrate predators. As a result, ants play a key role in controlling arthropod richness, abundance, and community structure. Some evidence shows that the evolution of myrmecophilous interactions has contributed to the abundance and ecological success of ants, by ensuring a dependable and energy-rich food supply, thus providing a competitive advantage for ants over other invertebrate predators. Most myrmecophilous associations are opportunistic, unspecialized, and facultative (meaning both species are capable of surviving without the interaction), though obligate mutualisms (those in which one or both species are dependent on the interaction for survival) have also been observed for many species.

As ant nests grow, they are more likely to house more and greater varieties of myrmecophiles. This is partly because larger colonies have greater specializations, so more diversity of ecology within the nests, allowing for more diversity and population sizes among the myrmecophiles.

Myrmecophile
A "myrmecophile" is an organism that lives in association with ants.

Myrmecophiles may have various roles in their host ant colony. Many consume waste materials in the nests, such as dead ants, dead larvae, or fungi growing in the nest. Some myrmecophiles, however, feed on the stored food supplies of ants, and a few are predatory on ant eggs, larvae, or pupae. Others benefit the ants by providing a food source for them. Most associations are facultative, benefiting one or both participants, but not being necessary to their survival, but many myrmecophilous relationships are obligate, meaning one or the other participant requires the relationship for survival.

Myrmecophilous associations are best known in butterflies of the family Lycaenidae. Many lycaenid caterpillars produce nectar by specialized organs, and communicate with the ants through sound and vibrations. The association with ants is believed to reduce the parasitisation of the butterfly caterpillars.

Some myrmecophilous beetles are in the families Coccinellidae (e.g. the ladybird Thalassa saginata), Aphodiidae, Scarabaeidae, Lucanidae, Cholevidae, Pselaphidae, Staphylinidae, Histeridae, and Ptiliidae (some treated here as subfamilies). In ant-beetle associations, the myrmecophilous staphylinids are the most diverse of the beetle families. Myrmecophilous associations are also seen in various other insects, such as aphids and treehoppers, as well as the hoverfly genus Microdon and several other groups of flies.

Ant nests provide environmentally stable environments that are well organized and protected by the host colony. The benefit of ant colonies has resulted in infiltration from a variety of myrmecophiles. The ant guests can have a positive, neutral, or negative effect on the colony. If the infiltrating species' impact is too negative on the colony, they risk discovery; this usually results in relatively small populations of myrmecophiles. Some spider species will use traits such as myrmecomorphy – ant mimicry - and chemical mimicry to infiltrate ant nests, usually to prey on food supplies or the ants themselves. Aribates javensis, a species of oribatid mites, is an obligate myrmecophile that lives in ant nests. These mites are cared for by their ant hosts in exchange for eating litter and bacteria in the nest.

Other myrmecophile groups include:
 Orthoptera, such as the cricket Myrmecophilus acervorum
 Diptera, such as the stratiomyid fly Clitellaria obtusa
Blattodea, such as the Attaphila cockroaches
 Molluscs, such as Allopeas myrmekophilos

The first major work in cataloguing British myrmecophiles was done by Horace Donisthorpe in his 1927 book The Guests of British Ants.

Ant-plant interactions

Ant-plant interactions are geographically widespread, with hundreds of species of myrmecophytic plants in several families, including the Leguminosae, Euphorbiaceae, and Orchidaceae. In general, myrmecophytes (or ant plants) usually provide some form of shelter and food in exchange for ant "tending", which may include protection, seed dispersal (see myrmecochory), reduced competition from other plants, hygienic services, and/or nutrient supplementation.

Three of the most common and important structural adaptations of ant plants are extrafloral nectaries, domatia, and (least commonly) Beltian bodies. Plant domatia are formed nesting sites provided by the plant in the form of hollow stems, petioles, thorns, or curled leaves. The production of ant-specialized domatia has been documented in over 100 genera of tropical plants. Beltian bodies provide a high-energy food source to ants in the form of nutritive corpuscles produced on leaflet tips, and they have been described in at least 20 plant families. Extrafloral nectaries (EFNs) are known to occur in at least 66 families of angiosperm plants in both temperate and tropical regions, as well as some ferns, but are absent in all gymnosperms and are most abundant in the tropics. EFNs being outside of the plant flowers are not employed in pollination; their primary purpose is to attract and sustain tending ants. Many plants can control the flow of nectar from the EFNs so that the availability of nectar varies according to daily and seasonal cycles. Because ants can respond quickly to changes in flow rate from EFNs, this may be possible mechanism by which plants can induce greater ant activity during times of peak herbivory, and minimize overall costs of nectar production. The combined nutritional output of EFNs and Beltian bodies can be a significant food source for tending ants, and in some cases can provide the total nutritive needs for an ant colony.

In exchange for nesting sites and food resources, ants protect plants from herbivores. One of the best-known examples of ant-plant mutualism is in bullhorn acacias (Acacia cornigera) and their tending Pseudomyrmex ants in Central America. This system was studied by Daniel Janzen in the late 1960s, who provided some of the first experimental evidence that ants significantly reduce herbivory rates of myrmecophytes. Since then many other studies have demonstrated similar results in other systems. In the bullhorn acacia system, in exchange for protection, the acacias provide domatia, Beltian bodies, and EFNs, and  evidence indicates that the Pseudomyrmex ants can survive exclusively on these food resources without having to forage elsewhere. For many plants, including the bullhorn acacias, ants can significantly reduce herbivory from both phytophagous insects and larger organisms, such as large grazing mammals. Obligately associated ant species are some of most aggressive ants in the world, and can defend a plant against herbivory by large mammals by repeatedly biting their attacker and spraying formic acid into the wound.

Myrmecophily is considered a form of indirect plant defense against herbivory, though ants often provide other services in addition to protection. Some ants provide hygienic services to keep leaf surfaces clean and deter disease, and defense against fungal pathogens has also been demonstrated. Ants commonly prune epiphytes, vines, and parasitic plants from their host plant, and they sometimes thin the shoots of neighboring plants, as well. In doing so, ants reduce plant-plant competition for space, light, nutrients, and water. Finally, current work focusing on ants' role in nutrient supplementation for plants has shown that in many ant-plant relationships, nutrient flow is bidirectional. One study has estimated that while 80% of the carbon in the bodies of Azteca spp. workers is supplied by the host tree (Cecropia spp.), 90% of the Cecropia tree's nitrogen was supplied by ant debris carried to the tree as a result of external foraging. In light of these services, myrmecophily has been considered advantageous in ensuring a plant's survival and ecological success, although the costs to the plant of providing for the ants can sufficiently high to offsets benefits.

Ant-arthropod interactions 
Many species of arthropods are dependent on ant species and live amongst them in their nests. Mites are particularly adept at being myrmecophiles, being that they are small enough to enter nests easily and to not be evicted from the homes and bodies of ants. In fact, 
multiple studies show mites exhibit extreme myrmecophily to numbers far above other myrmecophiles.

Ant-insect interactions
Ants tend a wide variety of insect species, most notably lycaenid butterfly caterpillars and hemipterans. About 41% of all ant genera include species that associate with insects. These types of ant-insect interactions involve the ant providing some service in exchange for nutrients in the form of honeydew, a sugary fluid excreted by many phytophagous insects. . Interactions between honeydew-producing insects and ants is often called trophobiosis, a term which merges notions of trophic relationships with symbioses between ants and insects. This term has been criticized, however, on the basis that myrmecophilous interactions are often more complex than simple trophic interactions, and the use of symbiosis is inappropriate for describing interactions among free-living organisms.

Insects may also form adaptations to contend with ant aggression, resulting in either mutualistic or parasitic bonds with ant colonies. Some beetles from the family Coccinellidae have developed behaviors, body shapes, and chemical mimicry to prey on ant-tended aphids.

Hemiptera

Some of the most well-studied myrmecophilous interactions involve ants and hemipterans (earlier grouped in the order Homoptera, which included the Auchenorrhyncha and Sternorrhyncha), especially aphids. Around 4000  species of aphids are described, and they are the most abundant myrmecophilous organisms in the northern temperate zones. Aphids feed on the phloem sap of plants, and as they feed, they excrete honeydew droplets from their anuses. The tending ants ingest these honeydew droplets, then return to their nest to regurgitate the fluid for their nestmates (see trophallaxis). Between 90 and 95% of the dry weight of aphid honeydew is various sugars, while the remaining matter includes vitamins, minerals, and amino acids. Aphid honeydew can provide an abundant food source for ants (aphids in the genus Tuberolachnus can secrete more honeydew droplets per hour than their body weight) and for some ants, aphids may be their only source of food. In these circumstances, ants may supplement their honeydew intake by preying on the aphids once the aphid populations have reached certain densities. In this way, ants can gain extra protein and ensure efficient resource extraction by maintaining honeydew flow rates that do not exceed the ants' collection capabilities. Even with some predation by ants, aphid colonies can reach larger densities with tending ants than colonies without. Ants have been observed to tend large "herds" of aphids, protecting them from predators and parasitoids. Aphid species that are associated with ants often have reduced structural and behavioral defense mechanisms, and are less able to defend themselves from attack than aphid species that are not associated with ants.

Ants engage in associations with other honeydew-producing hemipterans, such as scale insects (Coccidae), mealybugs (Pseudococcidae), and treehoppers (Membracidae), and most of these interaction are facultative and opportunistic with some cases of obligate associations, such as hemipterans that are inquiline, meaning they can only survive inside ant nests. In addition to protection, ants may provide other services in exchange for hemipteran honeydew. Some ants bring hemipteran larvae into the ant nests and rear them along with their own ant brood. Additionally, ants may actively aid in hemipteran dispersal; queen ants have been observed transporting aphids during their dispersive flights to establish a new colony, and worker ants often carry aphids to a new nesting site if the previous ant nest has been disturbed. Ants may also carry hemipterans to different parts of a plant or to different plants to ensure a fresh food source and/or adequate protection for the herd.

Lycaenid butterflies

Myrmecophily among lycaenid caterpillars differs from the associations of hemipterans because caterpillars feed on plant tissues, not phloem sap, and therefore do not continually excrete honeydew. Caterpillars of lycaenid butterflies have therefore evolved specialized organs that secrete chemicals to feed and appease ants. The secretions are a mixture of sugar and amino acids, which in synergy is more attractive to the ants than either component in its own. The secretions of Narathura japonica caterpillars are thought to be more than merely providing nutrition, with components that cause behavior alteration in the ants, with a reduction in the locomotory activity of caterpillar attendants, increased aggression and protectiveness by Pristomyrmex punctatus ants, suggesting that the association are better treated as parasitic than mutualistic. Because caterpillars do not automatically pass honeydew, they must be stimulated to secrete droplets, and do so in response to ant antennation, which is the drumming or stroking of the caterpillar's body by the ants' antennae. Some caterpillars possess specialized receptors that allow them to distinguish between ant antennation and contact from predators and parasites, and others produce acoustic signals that agitate ants, making them more active and likely better defenders of the larvae. As with homopteran myrmecophiles, ants protect lycaenid larvae from predatory insects (including other ants) and parasitoid wasps, which lay their eggs in the bodies of many species of Lepidoptera larvae. For example, one study conducted by Pierce and colleagues in Colorado experimentally found that for the larvae of Glaucopsyche lygdamus that were tended by a certain ant species (Formica podzolica), compared to untended larvae, the percentage of larvae disappearing from plants before late final instar decreased (not statistically significantly, though) and the percentage of larvae infected by parasitoids significantly decreased (from 33% to 9%–12%). These interactions do not come without an energetic cost to the butterfly, however, and  ant-tended individuals reach smaller adult sizes than untended individuals due to the costs of appeasing ants during the larval stage. Interactions with ants are not limited to the butterfly's larval stage, and in fact ants can be important partners for butterflies at all stages of their lifecycles. For example, adult females of many lycaenid butterflies, such as J. evagoras, preferentially oviposit on plants where ant partners are present, possibly by using ants' own chemical cues to locate sites where juvenile butterflies will likely be tended by ants. While ant attendance has been widely documented in lycaenid butterflies and to some extent in riodinid butterflies such as Eurybia elvina, many other lepidopteran species are known to associate with ants, including many moths.

Rove beetles

Multiple levels of myrmecophily
Many trophobiotic ants can simultaneously maintain associations with multiple species. Ants that interact with myrmecophilous insects and myrmecophytes are highly associated; species that are adapted to interact with one of these myrmecophiles may switch among them depending on resource availability and quality. Of the ant genera that include species that associate with ant plants, 94% also include species that associate with trophobionts. In contrast, ants that are adapted to cultivate fungus (leaf cutter ants, tribe Attini) do not possess the morphological or behavioral adaptations to switch to trophobiotic partners. Many ant mutualists can exploit these multispecies interactions to maximize the benefits of myrmecophily. For example, some plants  host aphids instead of investing in EFNs, which may be more energetically costly depending on local food availability. The presence of multiple interactors can strongly influence the outcomes of myrmecophily, often in unexpected ways.

Significance of myrmecophily in ecology
Mutualisms are geographically ubiquitous, found in all organismic kingdoms, and play a major role in all ecosystems. Combined with the fact that ants are one of the most dominant lifeforms on earth,  myrmecophily clearly plays a significant role in the evolution and ecology of diverse organisms, and in the community structure of many terrestrial ecosystems.

Evolution of positive interactions
Questions of how and why species coevolve are of great interest and significance. In many myrmecophilous organisms, ant associations have been influential in the ecological success, diversity, and persistence of species. Analyses of phylogenetic information for myrmecophilous organisms, as well as ant lineages, have demonstrated that myrmecophily has arisen independently in most groups several times. Because  multiple gains (and perhaps losses) of myrmecophilous adaptations have happened, the evolutionary sequence of events in most lineages is unknown. Exactly how these associations evolve also remains unclear.

In studying the coevolution of myrmecophilous organisms, many researchers have addressed the relative costs and benefits of mutualistic interactions, which can vary drastically according to local species composition and abundance, variation in nutrient requirements and availability, host plant quality, presence of alternative food sources, abundance and composition of predator and parasitoid species, and abiotic conditions. Because of the large amounts of variation in some of these factors, the mechanisms that support the stable persistence of myrmecophily are still unknown. In many cases, variation in external factors can result in interactions that shift along a continuum of mutualism, commensalism, and even parasitism. In almost all mutualisms, the relative costs and benefits of interactions are asymmetrical; that is, one partner experiences greater benefits and/or fewer costs than the other partner. This asymmetry leads to "cheating", in which one partner evolves strategies to receive benefits without providing services in return. As with many other mutualisms, cheating has evolved in interactions between ants and their partners. For example, some lycaenid larvae are taken into ant nests, where they prey on ant brood and offer no services to the ants. Other lycaenids may parasitize ant-plant relationships by feeding on plants that are tended by ants, apparently immune to ant attack because of their own appeasing secretions. Hemipterophagous lycaenids engage in a similar form of parasitism in ant-hemipteran associations. In light of the variability in outcomes of mutualistic interactions, and also the evolution of cheating in many systems, much remains to be learned about the mechanisms that maintain mutualism as an evolutionarily stable interaction.

Species coexistence
In addition to leading to coevolution, mutualisms also play an important role in structuring communities. One of the most obvious ways in which myrmecophily influences community structure is by allowing for the coexistence of species that might otherwise be antagonists or competitors. For many myrmecophiles, engaging in ant associations is first and foremost a method of avoiding predation by ants. For example, the caterpillars of lycaenid butterflies are an ideal source of food for ants: they are slow-moving, soft-bodied, and highly nutritious, yet they have evolved complex structures to not only appease ant aggression, but also to elicit protective services from the ants. To explain why ants cooperate with other species as opposed to preying on them, two related hypotheses have been proposed; cooperation either provides ants with resources that are otherwise difficult to find, or it ensures the long-term availability of those resources.

Community structure
At both small and large spatiotemporal scales, mutualistic interactions influence patterns of species richness, distribution, and abundance. Myrmecophilous interactions play an important role in determining community structure by influencing inter- and intraspecific competition; regulating population densities of arthropods, fungi, and plants; determining arthropod species assemblages; and influencing trophic dynamics. Recent work in tropical forests has shown that ant mutualisms may play key roles in structuring food webs, as ants can control entire communities of arthropods in forest canopies. Myrmecophily has also been key in the ecological success of ants. Ant biomass and abundance in many ecosystems exceeds that of their potential prey, suggesting a strong role of myrmecophily in supporting larger populations of ants than would otherwise be possible. Furthermore, by providing associational refugia and habitat amelioration for many species, ants are considered dominant ecosystem engineers.

Myrmecophily as a model system
Myrmecophilous interactions provide an important model system for exploring ecological and evolutionary questions regarding coevolution, plant defense theory, food web structure, species coexistence, and evolutionarily stable strategies. Because many myrmecophilous relationships are easily manipulated and tractable, they allow for testing and experimentation that may not be possible in other interactions. Therefore, they provide ideal model systems in which to explore the magnitude, dynamics, and frequency of mutualism in nature.

See also
 Myrmecochory
 Myrmecophyte
 Myrmecotrophy
 Myrmecomorphy (ant mimicry)

References

Ecology
Myrmecology
Ants
Mutualism (biology)